Dokuy or Dokui is a department or commune of Kossi Province in western Burkina Faso. Its capital lies at the town of Dokuy. According to the 1996 census the department has a total population of 25,305.

Towns and villages
 Dokuy	(3 160 inhabitants) (capital)
 Ayoubakolon	(1 075 inhabitants)
 Bonikuy	(787 inhabitants)
 Dar-Es-Salam	(635 inhabitants)
 Dassi	(787 inhabitants)
 Denissa-Marka	(366 inhabitants)
 Denissa-Mossi	(336 inhabitants)
 Dokoura	(403 inhabitants)
 Doubalé	(432 inhabitants)
 Gassingo	(1 589 inhabitants)
 Goni	(2 402 inhabitants)
 Ilabekolon	(1 037 inhabitants)
 Kamadena	(1 549 inhabitants)
 Kanadougou	(1 156 inhabitants)
 Karasso	(1 107 inhabitants)
 Kemenso	(653 inhabitants)
 Kenekuy	(2 324 inhabitants)
 Kolonidara	(949 inhabitants)
 Kolonkoura	(890 inhabitants)
 Makuy	(536 inhabitants)
 Nereko	(1 210 inhabitants)
 Sokoura	(573 inhabitants)
 Soumakoro	(498 inhabitants)
 Soum	(591 inhabitants)
 Tomikoroni	(260 inhabitants)

References

Departments of Burkina Faso
Kossi Province